William C. Foulds (October 8, 1887 – May 14, 1954) was a Canadian football player, coach, referee, and administrator who was the head coach of the Toronto Argonauts for three seasons. He was the Vice President of the CRU from 1933 to 1936 and was the President in 1921 and 1937. He was the Head Referee of the Big Four for a long time after his playing career was over. He died on May 14, 1954 at the age of 66. Foulds was a charter member of the Canadian Football Hall of Fame.

Early life

Playing career 
Foulds started his playing career with the Toronto Varsity Blues in the 1900s. He was with them when they won the 1st and 2nd Grey Cup. After 1910, he became the coach of the Toronto Argonauts following the retirement of Joe Lee. He would bring the Argonauts to the 3rd Grey Cup, but would lose to his former team, the Toronto Varsity Blues. He was their Quarterback for the next few years and became their coach again in 1914. He was the Co-Coach in 1915 along with Warren Coryell. He later became a referee and was the Head Referee of the Big Four until his death in 1954.

Later career
In 1921 and in 1937 he was the CRU President. He was their vice president from 1933 to 1936. He was also their chairman for a long time. He was a charter member for the Canadian Football Hall of Fame in 1963.

Death
Foulds died on May 14, 1954 at the age of 66 from a heart attack.

References

Further reading

1880s births
1954 deaths
Toronto Argonauts players
Toronto Argonauts coaches
Toronto Varsity Blues football players